KammerChor Saarbrücken is a chamber choir based in Saarbrücken, Saarland, Germany. It was established in 1990 by conductor Georg Grün.

References

External links
Official site

German choirs
1990 establishments in Germany
Musical groups established in 1990